Clematis hedysarifolia is a  liana, endemic to peninsular India, belonging to the buttercup family (Ranunculaceae). It was described by Augustin Pyramus de Candolle and published in Regni Vegetabilis Systema Naturale 1: 148, in 1817.

Description
It is a woody evergreen climber, with the following features:
 Branches -  ribbed, roundish, thinly sprinkled with very fine soft hairs when young.
 Leaves - pinnate or bipinnate, opposite, in pairs alternately perpendicular, with wide intervals between the pairs, with 3 leaflets.
Petiole : purplish, slightly hairy, up to 9 cm long, sometimes twining.
Leaflets : leathery, green, glabrous, stalked, entire, ovate lanceolate, with acuminate apex, base rounded or cordate, strongly reticulate, .
 Inflorescence -  Flower panicles are arise in leaf axils and at the end of branches, pendulous, many-flowered, branchlets stiff, decussately opposite and wide apart. Flower stalks are slender, hairy, bearing two small opposite abortive buds below their middle. Flowers are white, furred on the outside, about 1.6 cm across.
 Flowers - yellowish-green to white, furred on the outside, about 1.6 cm across.
 Sepals - 4, ovate, ovate-oblong, externally tomentose
 Petals - 4, ovally oblong, equal, blunt, cruciately rotate.
 Stamens - cream-coloured, upright, about 1/4 shorter than the petals, many, smooth.
 Anthers - Compressed, threadlike filaments. Anthers of same color, linearly oblong, upright with a short obtuse point and a flattish receptacle.
 Pistils - longer than the stamens, greenish.
 Fruit/Seeds - Achenes  compressed,  broadly  elliptic  or  ovate, hairy,  5mm × 3mm.
Easily distinguished from the common Clematis gouriana, by the larger flowers and aristate (pointed) anthers.

Distribution
The species is endemic to India, and found in forests of Gujarat, Maharashtra, Goa, and  Karnataka states. The creeper occurs in moist deciduous forests  between the altitudes of
500–1500 m. Flowering is October–November, and fruiting is in December.

References

External links 

 

hedysarifolia
Plants described in 1817